This is a list of school districts in Newfoundland and Labrador.

 Newfoundland and Labrador English School District 
 Conseil Scolaire Francophone

Former school districts:
 Eastern School District of Newfoundland and Labrador
 Nova Central School District

References

School districts
Newfoundland and Labrador, school districts
Education in Newfoundland and Labrador